William Pitt Murray (June 21, 1825 – June 20, 1910) was an American politician and lawyer.

Born in Hamilton, Ohio, Murray went to the Ohio public school system. He studied at Miami University and the Indiana University Law School. In 1849, Murray was admitted to the Indiana bar. He then moved to Saint Paul, Minnesota Territory and practiced law. Murray was a Democrat. He served in the Minnesota Territorial House of Representatives in 1852-1853 and 1857. Murray also served in the Minnesota Territorial Council in 1854 and 1855. He was elected to the Territorial Minnesota House of Representatives for the 1858-1859 session but that session was never called. Murray did serve in the Minnesota House of Representatives in 1863 and 1868. He served in the Minnesota Senate in 1866 and 1867 and in 1875 and 1876. Murray served on the Ramsey County Board of Commissioners and the Saint Paul City Council. Murray died, at his home, from appendicitis, in Saint Paul, Minnesota just one day before his eighty-fifth birthday.

Notes

External links

1825 births
1910 deaths
Politicians from Hamilton, Ohio
Politicians from Saint Paul, Minnesota
Miami University alumni
Indiana University Maurer School of Law alumni
Indiana lawyers
Minnesota lawyers
County commissioners in Minnesota
Minnesota city council members
Minnesota state senators
Members of the Minnesota House of Representatives
Members of the Minnesota Territorial Legislature
19th-century American lawyers